Jaroslav Bím (12 January 1931 – 9 April 2012) was a Czech gymnast. He competed at the 1956 Summer Olympics and the 1960 Summer Olympics.

Bím died on 9 April 2012, at the age of 81.

References

External links
 

1931 births
2012 deaths
Czech male artistic gymnasts
Olympic gymnasts of Czechoslovakia
Gymnasts at the 1956 Summer Olympics
Gymnasts at the 1960 Summer Olympics
People from Kyjov
Sportspeople from the South Moravian Region